Maru Daba (born 12 December 1980) is a retired Ethiopian long-distance runner, who specialized in the 3000 metres steeplechase. He represented Ethiopia at the 2000 Sydney Olympics and at the 1999 World Championships in Athletics.

His personal best time is 8:25.04 minutes, achieved in June 2003 in Rennes.
 
At the 1998 IAAF World Cross Country Championships in Marrakech Daba finished tenth in the short race and won a bronze medal with the Ethiopian team.

External links

Girma Maru Daba. Sports Reference. Retrieved on 2015-02-02.

1980 births
Living people
Ethiopian male long-distance runners
Ethiopian male steeplechase runners
Athletes (track and field) at the 2000 Summer Olympics
Olympic athletes of Ethiopia
World Athletics Championships athletes for Ethiopia
21st-century Ethiopian people